Manduca lucetius is a moth of the  family Sphingidae. It is known from Suriname, Brazil, Ecuador, Peru, Bolivia and Paraguay.

There is variation in the shape of the forewings. There are conspicuous black patches on the forewing upperside which, together with the patch in the discal cell, form a large semicircle filled with black scaling.

The larvae feed on Lycopersicon species (including Lycopersicon esculentum), Brugmansia arborea, Brunfelsia uniflora, Capsicum annuum and Solanum sisymbriifolium.

References

Manduca
Moths described in 1780